Tinicum Township, Pennsylvania could refer to:

Tinicum Township, Bucks County, Pennsylvania
Tinicum Township, Delaware County, Pennsylvania

Pennsylvania township disambiguation pages